The 2021 Newcastle City Council election took place on 6 May 2021 to elect members of Newcastle City Council in England. This was on the same day as other local elections. One-third of the seats were up for election, with two wards (Byker and Chapel) electing two councillors.

Results

Ward results

Arthur's Hill

Benwell and Scotswood

Blakelaw

Byker

Callerton and Throckley

Castle

Chapel

Dene and South Gosforth

Denton and Westerhope

Elswick

Fawdon and West Gosforth

Gosforth

Heaton

Kenton

Kingston Park South and Newbiggin Hall

Lemington

Manor Park

Monument

North Jesmond

Ouseburn

Parklands

South Jesmond

Walker

Walkergate

West Fenham

Wingrove

By-elections

Castle

References 

Newcastle
Newcastle City Council elections